Culver Lucias Hastedt (October 16, 1884 – November 2, 1966) was an American sprinter and Olympic gold medalist in 1904. He was known as "The King of the Handicaps," winning gold medals in the 60-yard dash, the 100-yard dash and the running broad jump at the 1904 Summer Olympics in St. Louis, Missouri. Also, in the Olympic Open Meet, he won the 100-yard dash and won second place in the broad jump.

In the 1904 Olympic Games, "handicap" did not refer to any type of physical impairment. Instead, these were events in which some athletes, often amateurs, were given a slight advantage in position or location. These matches were additional track and field events that allowed lesser athletes the opportunity to compete head-to-head with superior professional Olympic competitors by giving them an advantage that leveled the playing field. In this era, a "handicap" winner is somewhat similar to an amateur winner of a professional event. In the 100-yard dash, Hastedt was given a 4-yard handicap, and in the 60-yard dash, he was given a 4-foot handicap. His victory in the 100-yard dash was the first won by a St. Louis athlete. The 1904 Olympics were also significant in that they were the first Olympics to be held in the United States.

References 

American male sprinters
1883 births
1966 deaths
Medalists at the 1904 Summer Olympics
Olympic gold medalists for the United States in track and field
Olympic silver medalists for the United States in track and field
Olympic gold medalists in athletics (track and field)
Olympic silver medalists in athletics (track and field)
Athletes (track and field) at the 1904 Summer Olympics